The Secret Voice is a 1936 British thriller film directed by George Pearson and starring John Stuart, Diana Beaumont and John Kevan. The screenplay concerns a scientist trying to prevent his new invention from being discovered by enemy spies.

Premise
A young scientist tries to protect his new invention from being discovered by enemy spies.

Cast
 John Stuart - Jim Knowles 
 Diana Beaumont - Helen Allinson 
 John Kevan - Dick Allinson 
 Henry Victor - Brandt 
 Ruth Gower - Joan Grayson 
 Monti DeLyle - Perez 
 James Carew - Scotty

References

External links

1936 films
1930s thriller films
1930s English-language films
Films directed by George Pearson
Films produced by Anthony Havelock-Allan
British black-and-white films
British and Dominions Studios films
Films shot at Imperial Studios, Elstree
British thriller films
1930s British films